Alyssa Underwood is a former Australian cricketer. A wicket-keeper, she played one List A match for Victoria during the 1999–2000 season of the Women's National Cricket League (WNCL), taking three catches.

References

External links
 

Year of birth missing (living people)
Place of birth missing (living people)
Living people
Australian cricketers
Australian women cricketers
Victoria women cricketers
Wicket-keepers